The Old Guard 2 is an upcoming American superhero film directed by Victoria Mahoney, from a screenplay by Greg Rucka, based on his comic book of the same name. Serving as a sequel to the first film, the film stars Charlize Theron, KiKi Layne, Marwan Kenzari, Luca Marinelli, Matthias Schoenaerts, Vân Veronica Ngô, Chiwetel Ejiofor, Uma Thurman and Henry Golding.

The Old Guard 2 is scheduled to be released by Netflix in the United States in 2023.

Cast 
 Charlize Theron as Andy/Andromache of Scythia
 KiKi Layne as Nile Freeman
 Marwan Kenzari as Joe/Yusuf Al-Kaysani
 Luca Marinelli as Nicky/Nicolò di Genova
 Matthias Schoenaerts as Booker/Sebastian Le Livre
 Vân Veronica Ngô as Quynh
 Chiwetel Ejiofor as James Copley
 Uma Thurman
 Henry Golding

Production

Development 
In July 2020, Greg Rucka said, "In case of sequel, break glass. It's very straightforward. You want another one? Here's a way to get into it". In the same month, Charlize Theron has expressed her interest in a second film, saying: "Let's have a little resting period, but just given the fact that all of us really want to do it, I'm sure when it's the right time, we'll start the conversation."

It was reported on January 27, 2021, that Netflix had greenlit a sequel. On August 26, it was announced that Victoria Mahoney would replace Gina Prince-Bythewood as director for the sequel. Theron, KiKi Layne, Marwan Kenzari, Luca Marinelli, Matthias Schoenaerts, Vân Veronica Ngô, and Chiwetel Ejiofor were cast to reprise their respective roles from the first film. In June 2022, Uma Thurman and Henry Golding were cast in undisclosed roles, while Greg Rucka was confirmed to have written the script for producers David Ellison, Dana Goldberg, Don Granger, Theron, Beth Kono, AJ Dix, Marc Evans, and Prince-Bythewood.

Filming 
Principal photography began in June 2022.  Some filming took place at the Italian Cinecittà Studios. In August 2022, another set on the lot caught fire when it was being dismantled, causing a production delay to The Old Guard 2.  Additional filming took place in the United Kingdom.  Filming was completed in September 2022.

Music 
By January 2023, Max Aruj and Ruth Barrett were set to compose the film, replacing Volker Bertelmann and Dustin O'Halloran who did the music for the first film.

Release 
The Old Guard 2 is scheduled to be released by Netflix in the United States in 2023.

References

External links 
 

2023 action adventure films
2020s superhero films
2023 films
American action adventure films
American action thriller films
American superhero films
Films about immortality
Films based on Image Comics
Films produced by Charlize Theron
Girls with guns films
Live-action films based on comics
Superhero thriller films
Skydance Media films
Upcoming Netflix original films